Milady 3000 is an Italian comic series featuring an eponymous character, created in 1980 by Magnus for the magazine Il Mago. The series continued until 1984 (also in the magazine Eureka), and was later published in France (in Métal Hurlant), in the United States (in Heavy Metal), in Belgium and Spain.

Synopsis
Milady is Paulina Zumo, a haughty Imperial Colonel and countess of the Zumo dynasty. Her stories, set in 3000 AD, are a science fiction mixture of many influences: these include Old Chinese costumes, Italian Renaissance intrigues, and hyper-technological environments. Magnus maintained he was also inspired by Alex Raymond's Flash Gordon for the series.

In her adventures, Milady is assisted by Uèr, an electro-chemical android who is desperately in love with her, in spite of Milady's repeated, contemptuous refusals.

Publication
 Il Principe dell'Equilibrio e della Quiete Galattica - Il Mago #94-96, January–March 1980
 Nel Palazzo di Kê - Il Mago #105, December 1980
 Intermezzo sul Proteo - Il Mago #105, December 1980
 Gran Condè - Eureka #248, February 1984
 Lord Black - Eureka #248, February 1984

1980 comics debuts
Italian comics titles
Métal Hurlant titles
Science fiction comics
Fiction set in the 30th century